Andres V. Brandi (born c. 1952) is an American college and professional tennis coach. He is currently co-head coach of the LSU Tigers tennis team with his son, Chris Brandi.

Brandi was formerly the coach of the Florida Gators women's tennis team and lead them to three National Collegiate Athletic Association (NCAA) national tournament championships in the 1990s.

Early life and education 
Brandi was born in San Juan, Puerto Rico.  He attended Trinity University in San Antonio, Texas, where he played for the Trinity Tigers men's tennis team in NCAA Division I competition.  Brandi graduated from Trinity University with a bachelor's degree in business administration in 1975.

In his early 20s, Brandi trained with the legendary Harry Hopman.

Coaching career 
Brandi was a touring pro for several years after graduating from college, but quickly discovered his true calling was refining the technique and improving the play of other up-and-coming professional tennis players.  Notably, he coached Kathy Rinaldi and Carling Bassett when they were rising talents.  Brandi was also the executive director of IMG Bollettieri Tennis Academy in Bradenton, Florida.

Brandi became the head coach of the Florida Gators women's tennis team at the University of Florida in Gainesville, Florida in August 1984.  From the 1985 season through 2001, he built the Lady Gators tennis program from a strong regional team into a national powerhouse, second only to the national rival Stanford Cardinal women's tennis team during his time the Gators' head coach.  His teams won three NCAA national tournament championships (1992, 1996, 1998), and were the runners-up in five other NCAA tournaments (1988, 1990, 1995, 1997, 1999), having reached the NCAA finals in eight of his seventeen seasons.  Brandi's Lady Gators also won six National Indoor Tennis Championships and fourteen Southeastern Conference (SEC) championships, and never finished lower than second in the SEC regular season standings.

In one unique career moment, two of Brandi's Lady Gators, Shaun Stafford and Halle Cioffi, played against each other in the individual NCAA singles championship final in 1988.  Gators Lisa Raymond (1992, 1993) and Jill Craybas (1996) also won individual NCAA singles championships during Brandi's tenure.  In NCAA doubles championship play, three Brandi-coached doubles teams won four NCAA doubles championships: Jillian Alexander and Nicole Arendt in 1991; Dawn Buth and Stephanie Nickitas in 1996 and 1997; and Whitney Laiho and Jessica Lehnhoff in 2001.

At the time of his resignation from the Gators coaching staff, he had the highest winning percentage (.915) of any coach in NCAA tennis history, and had the fifth highest number of career victories (460) among all NCAA tennis coaches, active and retired.  He was inducted into the University of Florida Athletic Hall of Fame as an "honorary letter winner" in 2006.

After leaving the University of Florida, Brandi has worked for IMG Academy, the Chris Everett Tennis Academy, and the Harold Solomon Tennis Institute.  Currently, he is a member of the player development staff and a national coach at the United States Tennis Association.

On June 13, 2017, Andy Brandi and Chris Brandi were named co-head coaches for the LSU Tigers tennis team.

Coaching Record

Tennis family 
Brandi and his wife Nancy have one son, Chris, who played for coach Andy Jackson's Florida Gators men's tennis team from 2003 to 2006. Chris Brandi was previously an assistant coach for the Wake Forest Demon Deacons men's tennis team before becoming co-head coach for the men's tennis team at LSU with his father. Andy Brandi's niece, Kristina Brandi, is a former touring pro who was ranked as high as twenty-seventh in the world.

See also 

 Florida Gators
 List of Florida Gators tennis players
 List of University of Florida Athletic Hall of Fame members
 List of Puerto Ricans
 LSU Tigers

References

External links 
Florida Gators bio

Year of birth uncertain
Living people
Florida Gators women's tennis coaches
LSU Tigers tennis coaches
People from San Juan, Puerto Rico
Puerto Rican male tennis players
Trinity University (Texas) alumni
Trinity Tigers men's tennis players
American tennis coaches
Year of birth missing (living people)